Regiment Erongo was a quick-reaction unit of the South West African Territorial Force.

History 
Regiment Erongo was formed in January 1980 as 912 Battalion and part of 91 Brigade of the South West Africa Territory Force.
91 SWA Brigade was a Reaction Force with its base at Windhoek, in sector 40. It acted as a mobile reserve to support SWATF operations in Sectors 20 in northern Namibia and was modelled on the SADF motorised brigade.

912 Battalion was part of 91 Brigade

2 SWA Specialist Unit  was formed in 1987 out of the parachute company of Regiment Erongo.

Regiment Erongo was disbanded upon the independence of Namibia in 1990-91.

Roll of Honour
05 Mar 1980: 72208721BT Rifleman Johannes Jacobus Maass from Regiment Erongo (912 Bn) was Killed in Action during a contact with PLAN insurgents in Northern Owamboland. He was 24.

23 Mar 1980: 71260731BT Corporal Renier Stephanus van Zyl from Regiment Erongo (912 Bn) SWATF was Killed in Action during a contact with SWAPO/PLAN insurgents in Northern Owamboland. He was 24.

Notes

See also
 Namibian War of Independence
 South African Border War

References

Further reading
Helmoed-Romer Heitman (Author), Paul Hannon (Illustrator), Modern African Wars (3): South-West Africa (Men-At-Arms Series, 242),  Osprey Publishing (November 28, 1991) .

Military history of Namibia
Military units and formations of the Cold War
Military units and formations of South Africa
Military units and formations of South Africa in the Border War
Military units and formations established in 1980
Military units and formations disestablished in 1991